GeoEye-1 is a high-resolution Earth observation satellite owned by DigitalGlobe, launched in September 2008. The satellite was acquired in the 2013 purchase of GeoEye.

History 
Its sensor is designed by the ITT Exelis.

The satellite, now known as GeoEye-1, was originally scheduled for launch in April 2008 but lost its 30-day launch slot to a U.S. government mission which had itself been delayed. It was rescheduled for launch 22 August 2008 from Vandenberg Air Force Base aboard a Delta II launch vehicle. The launch was postponed to 4 September 2008, due to unavailability of the Big Crow telemetry-relay aircraft.  It was delayed again to 6 September because Hurricane Hanna interfered with its launch crews.

The launch took place successfully on 6 September 2008 at 18:50:57 UTC. The GeoEye-1 satellite separated successfully from its Delta II launch vehicle at 19:49 UTC, 58 minutes and 56 seconds after launch.

Specifications and operation 
GeoEye-1 provides  panchromatic and  multispectral imagery at nadir in  swaths. GeoEye-1 can image up to 60 degrees off nadir. It is operated out of Dulles, Virginia.

At the time of its launch, GeoEye-1 was the world's highest resolution commercial Earth-imaging satellite. GeoEye-1 was manufactured in Gilbert, Arizona, by General Dynamics and the first image was returned on 7 October of Kutztown University in Pennsylvania.

Google, which had its logo on the side of the rocket, has exclusive online mapping use of its data.

The National Geospatial-Intelligence Agency and Google paid a combined  for the satellite and upgrades to GeoEye's four ground stations.

2009 anomaly 
In December 2009 GeoEye announced it had suspended imagery collections by GeoEye-1 for a few days, citing an irregularity in the downlink antenna. "The irregularity appears to limit the range of movement of GeoEye-1 downlink antenna, which may in turn affect GeoEye-1 ability to image and downlink simultaneously," GeoEye said at a press conference. However, the satellite continued with normal operations shortly thereafter, though with diminished simultaneous imaging-and-downlink capability for non-U.S. clients.

See also 

 2008 in spaceflight

References

External links 
 GeoEye-1 at Digitalglobe.com

Commercial imaging satellites of the United States
Google
Spacecraft launched in 2008
Spacecraft launched by Delta II rockets

fi:GeoEye#GeoEye 1